Al-Wihda International Stadium is a multi-use stadium in Zinjibar, Yemen. It is currently used mostly for football matches and serves as the home stadium of Hassan Abyan. The stadium holds 30,000 people. It hosted the 20th Arabian Gulf Cup football competition in 2010. The first match was held between Saudi Arabia and Kuwait.

Football venues in Yemen